Dibamus manadotuaensis is a legless lizard in the family Dibamidae. It is endemic to Manado Tua island off the coast of Sulawesi.

References

Dibamus
Endemic fauna of Indonesia
Reptiles of Sulawesi
Reptiles described in 2019
Taxa named by Wolfgang Böhme (herpetologist)